Ronald Wayne "Ron" Cutler is a Canadian Anglican bishop. He became Bishop of Nova Scotia and Prince Edward Island in 2014 and was elected Metropolitan of Canada in 2017.

Cutler was born in Montreal and educated at McGill University. 

He was ordained in 1981 and served at Twillingate, Smith's Sound, Sydney Mines, Baddeck and  Lower Sackville. He became a suffragan bishop in 2008 and was elected as the Diocesan on 22 November 2013. He was installed as the Bishop of Nova Scotia and Prince Edward Island on 5 May 2014. In 2017 he was elected Metropolitan of the Ecclesiastical Province of Canada, which encompasses southern and eastern Quebec, the Maritimes, and Newfoundland and Labrador.

On January 9, 2020, Cutler announced his retirement from both positions effective July 31.

References

External links
 Official page at Anglican Diocese of Nova Scotia and Prince Edward Island

Clergy from Montreal
Anglican bishops of Nova Scotia and Prince Edward Island
21st-century Anglican Church of Canada bishops
McGill University alumni
Living people
Year of birth missing (living people)